is a district located in Shiribeshi Subprefecture, Hokkaido, Japan.

As of 2004, the district has an estimated population of 4,055 and a density of 21.52 persons per km2. The total area is 188.41 km2.

Towns and villages
Furubira

Districts in Hokkaido